Intensified submarine warfare, a form of submarine warfare practiced by Germany in the first months of 1916, represented a German political compromise between the internationally recognised Prize Rules (which made submarines virtually ineffective as commerce raiders) and unrestricted submarine warfare (in which submarines sink merchant ships operating in designated War Zones without warning, and without provision for the safety of passengers or crew). Germany abandoned the policy in May 1916 due to U.S. political pressure arising from a number of incidents, most notably the torpedoing of the cross-channel ferry Sussex.

See also
Submarine warfare
Commerce raiding
Tonnage war
Unrestricted submarine warfare
Sussex pledge
U-boat

References & notes
Notes

Sources
  Conway's All the World's Fighting Ships 1906-1921 Conway Maritime Press, 1985. 
Tony Bridgeland. Outrage at Sea: Naval Atrocities in the First World War. Pen and Sword Books, 2002. 

Submarine warfare
Military strategy
Military doctrines
Naval warfare tactics